The discography of Modest Mouse, an American indie rock band, consists of seven studio albums, six extended plays, two compilation albums, four low fidelity cassette releases, one live album, twenty-five singles, and nine reissues. Three of their releases have been certified at least Gold by the Recording Industry Association of America (RIAA) for shipments in excess of 500,000 copies. One release has further been certified Platinum, for shipments in excess of 1,000,000 copies.

Modest Mouse formed in 1992 in Issaquah, Washington. This Is a Long Drive for Someone with Nothing to Think About was released as the band's debut album in April 1996. Sad Sappy Sucker was originally intended to be released instead, but was shelved. Sophomore album The Lonesome Crowded West followed in November 1997, and helped to earn the band a cult following; it has been cited by several publications as one of the best albums of the 1990s. After the album's release, Modest Mouse signed to major label Epic Records; The Moon & Antarctica, the band's major-label debut, was released in June 2000 to widespread acclaim from critics. The album was a harbinger of increased mainstream exposure to come; it was the band's first to chart in the United States, peaking at No. 120 on the Billboard 200. Following the success of The Moon & Antarctica, Sad Sappy Sucker was finally released in April 2001, several years after it had initially been shelved.

Mainstream recognition of Modest Mouse accelerated in 2004, with the release of Good News for People Who Love Bad News in April. The album charted at No. 18 in the United States and was their first to chart outside of their home country, peaking at No. 37 in Scotland and No. 40 in the United Kingdom. Lead single "Float On" was the band's first hit, peaking at No. 68 on the Billboard Hot 100 and at No. 1 on the same publication's Alternative Songs chart. Follow-up single "Ocean Breathes Salty" was a modest success, reaching No. 6 on Alternative Songs; both singles have since been certified Gold by the RIAA. March 2007's We Were Dead Before the Ship Even Sank was the only Modest Mouse album to feature former Smiths guitarist Johnny Marr as a member of the band. The album peaked at No. 1 in the United States and Canada, and also charted in several other countries. Lead single "Dashboard" currently stands as the band's highest-charting song to date on the Billboard Hot 100, where it peaked at No. 61; it also peaked at No. 5 on Alternative Songs.

In 2014, This Is a Long Drive for Someone with Nothing to Think About and The Lonesome Crowded West were re-released by frontman Isaac Brock's record label, Glacial Pace. The following March, Strangers to Ourselves was released as Modest Mouse's first studio album in eight years. "Lampshades on Fire", which had been released as the album's lead single in December 2014, was a No. 1 hit on Alternative Songs, with the album itself peaking at No. 3 in the United States and appearing on several other album charts elsewhere.

Albums

Studio albums

Cassettes

Compilation albums

Live albums

EPs

Reissues

Singles

Promotional singles

Other appearances

Music videos

Notes

References

Discographies of American artists
Rock music group discographies